Kittinger can refer to:

In business:
The Kittinger Company, a furniture company based in Buffalo, New York, United States

People with the surname Kittinger:
Joseph Kittinger (1928-2022), United States Air Force pilot, set parachute and balloon records for altitude
Jo Kittinger (born 1955), American children's book author